Bellevue in Newport, Kentucky, at 335 E. 3rd St., was the homestead of General James Taylor, Jr.  It is located on a small rise overlooking the Ohio River, towards Cincinnati.

It is a "free classic" Queen Anne-style house built in 1845.  It was listed on the National Register of Historic Places in 1976.

It has also been known as the General James Taylor House and as the Vonderhaar & Stetter Funeral Home.

References

National Register of Historic Places in Campbell County, Kentucky
Queen Anne architecture in Kentucky
Houses completed in 1845
Houses in Campbell County, Kentucky
Newport, Kentucky
1845 establishments in Kentucky
Houses on the National Register of Historic Places in Kentucky